Kaō (early 14th century) was a Japanese priest-painter whose work is considered typical of early Muromachi painting. He is especially known for his depiction of the legendary monk Kensu (Hsien-tzu in Chinese) at the moment he achieved enlightenment. This type of painting was executed with quick brushstrokes and a minimum of detail.

The biography of Kaō is largely unknown. He is commonly believed to have been a Japanese Zen monk who lived in China for more than ten years. He entered monastic life at a young age and traveled towards the end of the Kamakura period. Upon his return, it is believed that he became the abbot of a Zen temple.

See also
List of National Treasures of Japan (paintings)

References 

Year of birth missing
Year of death missing
Japanese painters
Kamakura period Buddhist clergy
Zenga
15th-century Japanese painters